The 2014 IAAF Continental Cup was an international track and field sporting event that was held in Marrakech, Morocco, on 13–14 September 2014.

It was the second edition of the IAAF Continental Cup since the name and format was changed from the IAAF World Cup.

Format
The four teams competing in the event was Africa, the Americas, Asia-Pacific and Europe. The two-day competition comprised a programme of 20 track and field events for men and women, giving a total of 40 events. Each team shall enter two athletes in each event, except for relays where one team competed, with a maximum of one athlete from each country per event. No athlete shall be allowed to double in the 3000 m and 5000 m.

Teams were selected as follows:
 Africa: 2014 African Championships (Marrakech, 10–14 August)
 Americas: selection by rankings
 Asia-Pacific: selection by rankings
 Europe: 2014 European Championships (Zürich, 12–17 August)

Standings

Medal summary

Men

Women

References

results website
IAAF announcement of host

External links
Official website

IAAF Continental Cup
2014 in African sport
Continental Cup
IAAF Continental Cup
IAAF Continental Cup
International athletics competitions hosted by Morocco